Cerová is a village and municipality in Senica District in the Trnava Region of western Slovakia. The village is divided into three parts: Cerová, Lieskové, and Rozbehy.

History
It was first mentioned in 1324 as Korlathkeu.

Geography
The municipality lies at an altitude of 248 metres and covers an area of 21.880 km2. It has a population of about 1265 people.

Genealogical resources

The records for genealogical research are available at the state archive "Statny Archiv in Bratislava, Slovakia"

 Roman Catholic church records (births/marriages/deaths): 1692-1902 (parish A)

Notable people
Kaneenika Janakova (born 1970) – ultra-distance runner

See also
 List of municipalities and towns in Slovakia

References

External links

Official page
https://web.archive.org/web/20071116010355/http://www.statistics.sk/mosmis/eng/run.html
Surnames of living people in Cerova

Villages and municipalities in Senica District